Soldado is a Spanish and Portuguese word meaning soldier. It may refer to:

Arts and media
El Soldado, a 1634 play by Luis Quiñones de Benavente
El Soldado, an 1892 play by Adolfo León Gómez
"El Soldado", a song recorded by Barbarito Díez
"Soldados", a 1985 song recorded by Legião Urbana
'El Soldado', an Argentine band featuring Skay Beilinson
Los Soldados, a 2013 novel by Pablo Aranda
 Sicario: Day of the Soldado, a 2018 film, sequel to the 2015 film Sicario

Places
Soldado Rock, a small island in Trinidad and Tobago
Los Soldados, an archaeological site in Veracruz

Other uses
 Soldado (surname)

See also
 
 Nibea soldado (N. soldado), the soldier croaker, a fish